James Hutton was a Scottish footballer who played as a left half.

Career
Born in Edinburgh, Hutton played club football for St Bernard's, and made one appearance for Scotland in 1887.

References

Year of birth missing
Year of death missing
Scottish footballers
Scotland international footballers
St Bernard's F.C. players
Association football wing halves
Place of death missing